Aurel Simion (born 7 April 1946) is a Romanian boxer. He competed in the men's featherweight event at the 1968 Summer Olympics. At the 1968 Summer Olympics, he defeated Mario Santamaria of Nicaragua, before losing to Miguel García of Argentina.

References

External links
 

1946 births
Living people
Romanian male boxers
Olympic boxers of Romania
Boxers at the 1968 Summer Olympics
Sportspeople from Suceava
Featherweight boxers